"Sideways" is a song written by American artist Clarence Greenwood, who is known by the pseudonym Citizen Cope. Although the song has never charted, it has been widely featured in pop culture. The song was included on Santana's 2002 album Shaman. Citizen Cope then included it in his 2004 album, The Clarence Greenwood Recordings. It has since been covered by Sheryl Crow, John Mayer, and Tyler James.

Original version
The song was included in Santana's Shaman album featuring Citizen Cope. Greenwood is credited as the writer and producer of this track. A two-line refrain in the song that is repeated is "These feelings won't go away, They've been knockin' me sideways," leading to its actual and its commonly mistaken title. This version uses an electric guitar backup behind Citizen Cope's vocals. Citizen Cope has a version featuring Santana with a music video that is set to scenes from the 2006 Hugh Jackman and Rachel Weisz film The Fountain.

Citizen Cope version
The song was included on Citizen Cope's 2004 album The Clarence Greenwood Recordings with a running time of 5:22. The Video for this version credits Craig M. Johnson as the director and was distributed by RCA Records. It features Greenwood playing a classical guitar while singing and various spliced images of him. A Re-recording of the song appears on a limited edition of Citizen Cope's 2010 album The Rainwater LP. Citizen Cope's version also appears on the 2005 compilation album Live At the World Cafe: Volume 19 with a running time of 5:19. The song is also included in 2010 Italian Film "Baciami Ancora"'s soundtrack.

Other versions
Sheryl Crow does a 5:11 version featuring Citizen Cope on her 2010 album 100 Miles from Memphis. Part of this version appeared on the November 1, 2011 "Hard Knocks" episode (episode 7) of Body of Proof's second season. The song was also performed live by guitarists Nuno Bettencourt and Zakk Wylde during the 2016 Generation Axe tour.

Pop culture

Featured in the 2005 film Just Like Heaven
Featured in the episode "My Jiggly Ball" of the television series Scrubs
Featured in 2006's Trust the Man
Featured in 2006's The Myth of More of the television series Windfall
Featured in 2008's Ghost Town
In the television series, One Tree Hill 
Featured on Entourage, episode "The Cannes Kids"
Featured in 2009's So You Think You Can Dance
Featured in 2010 Italian film Baciami ancora directed by Gabriele Muccino.

References

2004 singles
2002 songs
2010 singles